The de Havilland Canada DHC-2 Beaver is a single-engined high-wing propeller-driven short takeoff and landing (STOL) aircraft developed and manufactured by de Havilland Canada. It has been primarily operated as a bush plane and has been used for a wide variety of utility roles, such as cargo and passenger hauling, aerial application (crop dusting and aerial topdressing), and civil aviation duties.

Shortly after the end of the Second World War, de Havilland Canada decided to orient itself towards civilian operators. Based on feedback from pilots, the company decided that the envisioned aircraft should have excellent STOL performance, all-metal construction, and accommodate many features sought by the operators of bush planes. On 16 August 1947, the maiden flight of the aircraft, which had received the designation DHC-2 Beaver, took place. In April 1948, the first production aircraft was delivered to the Ontario Department of Lands and Forests. A Royal New Zealand Air Force (RNZAF) Beaver played a supporting role in Sir Edmund Hillary's famous 1958 Commonwealth Trans-Antarctic Expedition to the South Pole.

In addition to its use in civilian operations, the Beaver has been widely adopted by armed forces as a utility aircraft. The United States Army purchased several hundred aircraft; nine DHC-2s are still in service with the U.S. Air Force Auxiliary (Civil Air Patrol) for search and rescue. By 1967, over 1,600 Beavers had been constructed prior to the closure of the original assembly line. Various aircraft have been remanufactured and upgraded. Additionally, various proposals have been made to return the Beaver to production.

The Beaver's versatility and performance led to it being the preferred aircraft of bush pilots servicing remote locations in the Canadian north, and it is considered by aviation historians to be a Canadian icon. In 1987, the Canadian Engineering Centennial Board named the DHC-2 one of the top ten Canadian engineering achievements of the 20th century. The Royal Canadian Mint honoured the aircraft on a special edition Canadian quarter in November 1999, and on a 50-cent commemorative gold coin in 2008. Large numbers continue to be operational into the 21st century, while the tooling and type certificate for the Beaver have been acquired by Viking Air who continue to produce replacement components and refurbish examples of the type.

Development

Origins

Following the end of the Second World War, de Havilland Canada's management team, recognising that there would be a corresponding downturn in military orders in the immediate post-war climate, decided to focus the company's energies upon finding work within the civilian sector. The company had recently hired Punch Dickins as Director of Sales; Dickins carried out an extensive market research program in the form of requesting and collecting feedback from other pilots, to understand what they needed in a new aircraft. It was on the basis of this information from the prospective operators themselves, as opposed to aerodynamic research or fiscal data, that the future aircraft has its origins.

In response, almost without exception, these pilots specified their desire for tremendous extra power  and STOL performance, in a design that could be easily fitted with wheels, skis or floats. When de Havilland engineers noted this would result in poor cruise performance, one pilot replied, "You only have to be faster than a dog sled to be a winner". Other suggestions that were seemingly mundane, but important in the bush plane world, included the installation of full-sized doors on both sides of the aircraft, which meant that it could be readily loaded no matter which side of a dock it tied up on; the doors were also made wide enough to allow for a 44 Imperial gallon drum to be rolled up into the aircraft.

On 17 September 1946, de Havilland officially put together a design team consisting of Fred Buller, Dick Hiscocks, Jim Houston and Wsiewołod Jakimiuk, led by Phil Garratt. The new aircraft was designed to be all-metal (unlike older designs, like the famous Noorduyn Norseman), using "steel from the engine to the firewall, heavy aluminium truss frames with panels and doors throughout the front seat area, lighter trusses toward the rear and all monocoque construction aft". At the time, de Havilland Canada was still a British-owned company and there were plans to fit the evolving design with the British de Havilland Gipsy engine. As a result of its comparatively limited power, the wing area was greatly increased in order to maintain STOL performance. When Pratt & Whitney Canada offered to supply war-surplus  Wasp Junior radial engines at a low price, the aircraft ended up with extra power as well as the original long wing. The result was unbeatable STOL performance for an aircraft of its size.

In line with the convention for aircraft produced by de Havilland Canada being named after animals, it was decided that the new bush plane would be named after the beaver, which was known for its hard-working nature. On 16 August 1947, the maiden flight of the DHC-2 Beaver was in Downsview, Ontario; it was flown by Second World War flying ace Russell Bannock. After completing its flight test programme, the prototype received several adjustments and improvements in order for it to serve as a flying demonstration model ready for the sales circuit. The prototype was ultimately sold to Central British Columbia Airways, as a routine day-to-day working air-taxi airplane and continued to fly as such with various air-taxi operators until 1980, after which it was retired and preserved. In April 1948, the first production aircraft was delivered to the Ontario Department of Lands and Forests, who had been a design partner.

Production
Initial sales were slow, perhaps two or three a month but as the plane was demonstrated sales started to improve. A key event in the Beaver's history occurred the next year when the US Army commenced its search for a new utility aircraft to replace their fleet of Cessnas. The competition quickly boiled down to the Beaver and the Cessna 195. The Beaver won and during the Korean War, the US Army ordered 970, more than half of the overall production run for the type.

Soon, the Beaver grew to become an export success as orders for the type increased from customers around the world. Individual military services of more than 30 different nations would ultimately be included amongst its operators. In later life, as the type was gradually phased out of military service, many examples underwent conversion work so that they could continue to be operated as civilian aircraft instead. During the 1960s, de Havilland developed an improved model of the Beaver, the Mk.III Turbo Beaver, which was equipped with a Pratt & Whitney Canada PT6 turboprop engine. A total of sixty aircraft were built during the late 1960s. In 1967, when production of the type finally ceased, a total of 1,657 DHC-2 Beavers had been constructed.

The Beaver was designed for flight in rugged and remote areas of the world. Its STOL capability made it ideal for areas normally only accessible by canoe or foot. Because the aircraft often flies to remote locations and in cold climates, its oil reservoir filler is located in the cockpit and oil can be filled in flight. A series of upgrades to the basic design were incorporated. One major customer introduced the use of flat steps replacing the earlier tubes, a feature now almost universal. In 1987, the Canadian Engineering Centennial Board named the DHC-2 as one of the top ten Canadian engineering achievements of the 20th century.

1995 to 2019 

At one point in its production, plans to license-build the Beaver in New Zealand were proposed. The remaining tooling was purchased by Viking Air of Victoria, British Columbia, Canada, which manufactures replacement parts for most of the early de Havilland line. By August 1995, Viking completed its 30th Turbo Beaver conversion. The firm has also developed and marketed other improvements for the type, such as an advanced wing and modified floats. Other manufacturers have also offered aftermarket upgrades and modifications for the type, such as re-engining programmes by Orenda Aerospace and Wipaire.

On 24 February 2006, Viking purchased the type certificates from Bombardier Aerospace for all the original de Havilland designs, including the Beaver. The ownership of the certificates gives the company the exclusive right to manufacture new aircraft. Viking has stated its interest in the potential restart of production of the Beaver, and commented that, dependent upon market demand, the firm may offer two separate models of the Beaver, one intended to be close to the design of the original batch, and another incorporating various improvements such as new avionics, engines, and doors, as well as likely being stretched to provide increased internal space.

Stolairus Aviation of Kelowna, British Columbia has developed several modifications for the DHC-2 including a STOL Kit which modifies the wing with a contoured leading edge, flap-gap seals, wing fences and drooped wingtips for increased performance. Stolairus has also developed a Wing Angle Kit which changes the incidence of the wing.

Advanced Wing Technologies of Vancouver, British Columbia has developed and certified a new wing for the DHC-2. So far, at least two Beavers have been modified in such a manner.

In September 2017 the Transportation Safety Board of Canada recommended stall warning devices be mandated for commercial Beaver operators.

In March 2019, Harbour Air announced plans to convert a DHC-2 Beaver to an electric aircraft and eventually to convert its entire fleet. The first test flight of the aircraft took place in Vancouver in December 2019.

Design
The de Havilland Canada DHC-2 Beaver is a single-engined high-wing propeller-driven STOL aircraft, principally operated as a bush plane and other utility roles, such as cargo and passenger hauling, aerial application (crop dusting and aerial topdressing), and general civil aviation purposes; aviation publication Plane & Pilot described the type as being "arguably the best bush plane ever built". The Beaver was designed to operate in all seasons and the majority of weather conditions; a large proportion were also equipped with floats for buoyancy in water; it reportedly possesses favourable performance characteristics for a floatplane. As a result of its favourable characteristics as a hard working and productive aircraft, the Beaver has had a lengthy service life and many examples have been remanufactured or have otherwise received life extension modifications.

The Beaver is typically powered by a single  Pratt & Whitney R-985 Wasp Junior radial engine. In order to provide the necessary weight balance for optimal loading flexibility, the engine was mounted as far rearwards as possible, resulting in elements intruding into the cockpit space, such as the oil tank being positioned within the center console between the pilot and copilot's feet and the main fuel tank within the forward belly of the aircraft, which also improves accessibility for replenishment. Many Beavers have had wingtip tanks also installed; careful fuel management between the various fuel tanks is required throughout flights in order to maintain the aircraft's center of gravity. The remanufactured DHC-2T Turbo Beaver is equipped with a  PT6A-34 turboprop engine.

While the front doors are narrow, the aft doors are wider, having been designed to facilitate the loading of 55-gallon barrels, either upright or on their sides. The Beaver is considered a 'working' aircraft, which was designed for vigorous use. In addition to cargo, passengers can also be carried; when appropriately fitted out, the Beaver Mk.I can accommodate up to seven passengers while the more spacious Beaver Mk.III can hold a maximum of 11. Various alterations have been approved, including alternative seating arrangements, enlarged cargo doors, larger windows and smaller batteries have been approved for use.

During takeoff, both the ailerons and flaps are lowered, which is a relatively uncommon design approach but results in substantially elevated STOL performance. The flaps can be deployed to an extreme range, extending out at full to a 58-degree position; the flight manual notes that the full setting is recommended only for performing emergency landings. In the skies, the Beaver is relatively easy to handle, having been described as possessing light and comfortable controls. Effective application of the rudder is necessary to counteract adverse yaw. It should be flown with a relatively nose-low pitch attitude to maintain airspeed. It is very easy to land, even in moderately rough water.

Operational history

Despite the fact that production ceased in 1967, hundreds of Beavers are still flying—many of them heavily modified to adapt to changes in technology and needs. Kenmore Air of Kenmore, Washington, provides Beaver and Otter airframes with zero-hour fatigue-life ratings, and owns dozens of supplemental type certificates (STCs) for aircraft modifications. These modifications are so well known and desirable in the aviation community, rebuilt Beavers are often called "Kenmore Beavers" or listed as having "Kenmore mods" installed.The original Wasp Jr radial engine of the Beaver is long out of production, so repair parts are getting harder to find. Some aircraft conversion stations have addressed this problem by replacing the piston engine with a turboprop engine such as the PT6. The added power and lighter installed weight, together with greater availability of kerosene fuel instead of high-octane aviation gasoline, make this a desirable modification, but at a high cost.

The Beaver was deployed by the British Army Air Corps during the Troubles, at least until 1979, for photo-reconnaissance missions. One of them was hit seven times by machine gun fire in South County Armagh, near the border with the Republic of Ireland in November 1979, while taking photos of an IRA checkpoint. The border crossing where the action took place became known to the British Army as "Beaver Junction".

Operators of significant numbers of piston-Beavers in early 2008 include Air Saguenay and Harbour Air in Canada and Kenmore Air in the US.

American actor Harrison Ford owns a DHC-2 Beaver; he is known for referring to it as being his favourite among his entire fleet of private aircraft.The Civil Air Patrol operated many of the DHC-2 Beaver, where it was commonly used for conducting search and rescue missions. For some decades, the United States Navy has operated a pair of DHC-2s at the United States Naval Test Pilot School, where they are used to instruct students in the evaluation of lateral-directional flying qualities and for the towing of gliders.

In recent years, growing numbers of the type have been used within the leisure industry, being used for pleasure flight and as lifting platforms for skydiving and aerial film activities. The DHC-2 Beaver has been used by skydiving operators due to its good climb rate.

Variants
 Single-engined STOL utility transport aircraft.
Beaver AL Mk 1 STOL utility transport aircraft for the British Army.
C-127 original designation for DHC-2 aircraft used by the U.S. military, redesignated L-20.
YL-20 Test and evaluation aircraft for the US military.
L-20A Beaver STOL utility transport aircraft for the U.S. Army, later redesignated U-6A in 1962, 968 built.
L-20B Beaver Basically similar to the L-20A, but with minor equipment changes. Six were sold to the US Army. Later redesignated U-6B in 1962.
U-6AUS Army L-20A aircraft re-designated
U-6BUS Army L-20B aircraft re-designated
Beaver II One aircraft was fitted with an Alvis Leonides radial piston engine.
Wipaire Super Beaver Conversion of surplus US Army and USAF L-20 Beavers.
Wipaire Boss Turbo-Beaver Turbo conversion fitted with PT-6 but retaining the original lower curved fin shape
 Powered by a 431 kW (578 ehp) Pratt & Whitney PT6A-6 or -20 turboprop engine.
Airtech Canada DHC-2/PZL-3S After-market conversion by Airtech Canada in the 1980s, using current-production PZL-3S radial engines of 600 hp (450 kW).
Volpar Model 4000 A 1970s conversion by Volpar, first flown in April 1972 with a modified nose fitted with an AiResearch TPE331-2U-203 turboprop with a three-bladed propeller. Other changes included a new fin and rudder.
 Turbo Beaver Remanufactured Beavers by Viking Air, upgraded with a Pratt & Whitney Canada PT6A-34  turboprop engine.

Operators

Civil
The DHC-2 is popular with air charter companies, police forces and small air taxi operators as well as private individuals and companies. Both the Royal Canadian Mounted Police and Finnish Border Guard operate the aircraft.

Military operators

 Argentine Air Force
 Argentine Naval Aviation

 Royal Australian Air Force – Five in service 1955–1964.
 Antarctic Flight RAAF
 No. 1 Air Trials Unit

 Austrian Air Force

 Burma Air Force

 Royal Cambodian Air Force – received three L-20s from the United States in the late 1950s.

 Chilean Air Force

 Republic of China Air Force

 Colombian Air Force

 Fuezas Aéreas Ejército de Cuba (pre Cuban Revolution) operated at least eight.
 Cuban Air Force (post Cuban Revolution)

 Dominican Air Force

 Finnish Air Force
 Finnish Border Guard

 French Air Force

 Ghana Air Force - acquired 14 Beavers, in service 1960–1984.

 Greek Air Force
 Greek Army

Haiti Air Corps

Indonesian Air Force
Indonesian Army

 Imperial Iranian Air Force

 Kenya Air Force (in operation 1964–1983)

 Royal Lao Air Force

 Royal Netherlands Air Force

 Royal New Zealand Air Force

 Royal Air Force of Oman

 Panamanian Public Forces

 Paraguayan Air Force 4 U-6A donated by MAP in 1975

 Peruvian Air Force

 Philippine Air Force
 Philippine Navy
 Federation of South Arabia
 Federation of South Arabian Air Force

 Republic of Korea Air Force

 Republic of Vietnam Air Force

 South Yemen Air Force

 Royal Thai Army

 Turkish Army

 Army Air Corps - 46 x Beaver AL.1.

 Civil Air Patrol
 United States Army
 United States Air Force
 United States Navy

 SFR Yugoslav Air Force

 Zambian Air Force

Accidents and incidents

As of May 2019, there have been 313 incidents involving the DHC-2 and 663 deaths. A select few are listed:

 31 December 2017 – High-profile UK business leader Richard Cousins, four members of his family and a Canadian pilot died in the 2017 Sydney Seaplanes crash.

 13 May 2019 – In the 2019 Alaska mid-air collision, a Mountain Air Service DHC-2 and a Taquan Air de Havilland DHC-3 Turbine Otter collided over George Inlet, killing all 5 aboard the DHC-2 and 1 aboard the DHC-3. 
 20 May 2019 – Taquan Air Flight 20 overturned in the harbor in Metlakatla, Alaska, United States one week after the George Inlet crash, killing the pilot and single passenger. Taquan Air suspended all flights the following day.
 31 July 2020 – A DHC-2 carrying 6 people collided with a Piper PA-12 Super Cruiser piloted by Alaska State Representative Gary Knopp (the only one aboard) over Alaska's Kenai Peninsula.  All 7 people died.

Aircraft on display

Argentina
 P-05 – DHC-2 on static display at Museo Nacional de Aeronáutica de Argentina in Morón, Buenos Aires.

Bangladesh
 S2-ABR – DHC-2 preserved outside the National Museum of Science and Technology in Dhaka.
 S2-ABV – DHC-2 preserved outside the National Museum of Science and Technology in Dhaka.

Canada

 CF-FHB – DHC-2 on static display at the Canada Aviation and Space Museum in Ottawa, Ontario.
 CF-OBS – DHC-2 on display at the Canadian Bushplane Heritage Centre in Sault Ste. Marie, Ontario.
 AP-AKB – DHC-2 in storage at Canada Aviation and Space Museum in Ottawa.
 CF-PSM-X – Turbo-Beaver III on display at the Canadian Bushplane Heritage Centre in Sault Ste. Marie, Ontario.
 Composite – DHC-2 on static display at Bass Pro Shops at Vaughan Mills in Vaughan, Ontario. It is a composite airframe consisting of parts from construction number 1579.
 CF-MAA - DHC-2 on display at the Royal Aviation Museum of Western Canada in Winnipeg, Manitoba

China

 54-1725 (United States Army) U-6A on static display at the Military Museum of the Chinese People's Revolution in Beijing.
 1619 (Unmarked) – DHC-2 on static display at the Chinese Aviation Museum in Datangshan, Beijing.

Colombia
 408 – DHC-2 on static display at the Colombian Aerospace Museum near Tocancipá, Cundinamarca.

Finland
 OH-MVL – DHC-2 on static display at the Finnish Aviation Museum in Vantaa, Uusimaa.
 OH-MVM – DHC-2 on static display at the Maritime Centre Vellamo in Kotka, Kymenlaakso, Finland.

Indonesia
 U-3033 (Indonesian Army Aviation) – DHC-2 on static display at SMK Penerbangan Wira Aqasa Bhakti, Semarang, Central Java.

Iran

 6-9701 – L-20B on static display at The Military Museum, Sa'dabad Complex in Tehran.
 6-9704 – L-20B on static display at Tehran Aviation Exhibition near Mehrabad International Airport.

Japan
 JA3097 – DHC-2 on static display at Chunichi Shimbun Headquarters in Nagoya.

Netherlands
 S-6 – L-20 in storage at the Militaire Luchtvaart Museum in Soesterberg, Utrecht, Netherlands.
 JZ-PAD – DHC-2 on display at Aviodrome in Lelystad, Flevoland. Only front part of the fuselage is displayed.

New Zealand
 ZK-CMW – DHC-2 on static display at the Air Force Museum of New Zealand in Wigram, Canterbury. It is painted as NZ6001, an airframe that took part in the Trans-Antarctic Expedition.

Oman
 213 – Beaver AL.1 on static display at the Sultan's Armed Forces Museum near Muscat.

Serbia

 70101 – DHC-2 on static display at the Belgrade Aviation Museum in Surčin, Belgrade.

South Korea
 116772 – U-6A on static display at a museum in Imjingak, Gyeonggi Province.
 116837 – U-6A on static display at War Memorial of Korea, Seoul.
 82073 (painted as "58600") – U-6A on static display at Daejeon National Cemetery, Daejeon.

Taiwan
 8025 – U-6A on static display at Kueijen Army Airfield, Taoyuan City.
 8011 – U-6A on static display at Aviation Education Exhibition Hall near Republic of China Air Force Academy in Kaohsiung City.

Thailand
 26157 – L-20A on static display at Royal Thai Army Aircraft Maintenance Centre, Lopburi.

United Kingdom
 58-2062 (United States Army) – U-6A on static display at the Midland Air Museum in Baginton, Warwickshire.
 XP821 – Beaver AL.1 on static display at the Museum of Army Flying at AAC Middle Wallop in Middle Wallop, Hampshire. It has the British military serial number XP821.
 XP822 – Beaver AL.1 on static display at the Museum of Army Flying at AAC Middle Wallop in Middle Wallop, Hampshire. It has the British military serial number XP822.

United States

 51-6263 – U-6A on static display at the United States Army Aviation Museum at Fort Rucker near Daleville, Alabama.
 51-16501– U-6A on static display at the National Museum of the U.S. Air Force at Wright-Patterson Air Force Base in Dayton, Ohio.
 52-6087 – U-6A on static display at the Museum of Aviation at Robins Air Force Base near Warner Robins, Georgia.
 53-2817 – U-6A on static display at Camp San Luis Obispo in San Luis Obispo County, California.
 53-0367 – U-6A on static display at the 45th Infantry Division Museum in Oklahoma City, Oklahoma.
 N754 – Volpar Model 4000 on display at Ted Stevens Anchorage International Airport, Alaska.
 57-2570 – U-6A in storage at the New England Air Museum in Windsor Locks, Connecticut.
 58-1997 – U-6 on static display at the U.S. Army Transportation Museum at Joint Base Langley–Eustis near Newport News, Virginia. It has the USAF serial number 58-1997.
 58-2064 – U-6 in storage at the National Infantry Museum in Columbus, Georgia.

Specifications (DHC-2)

See also

References

Citations

Bibliography
Sydney seaplane crash: Wreckage raised from riverbed.
 Donald, David, ed. The Encyclopedia of World Aircraft. Etobicoke, Ontario: Prospero Books, 1997. .

 Hagedorn, Daniel P. Central American and Caribbean Air Forces. Tonbridge, Kent, UK: Air-Britain (Historians) Ltd., 1993. .
 Harnden, Toby.Bandit Country: The IRA and South Armagh. Philadelphia, PA: Coronet Books, 2000. .
 Grandolini, Albert. "L'Aviation Royals Khmere: The first 15 years of Cambodian military aviation". Air Enthusiast, Thirty-seven, September–December 1988. pp. 39–47. ISSN 0143-5450.

 Hotson, Fred W. The de Havilland Canada Story. Toronto: CANAV Books, 1983. .
 Lambert, Mark. Jane's All the World's Aircraft 1990–91. Coulsdon, UK: Jane's Defence Data, 1990. .
 Pither, Tony. Airline Fleets 2008. Staplefield, West Sussex, UK: Air-Britain (Historians) Ltd, 2008. .
 Rossiter, Sean. The Immortal Beaver: The World's Greatest Bush Plane. Vancouver: Douglas & McIntyre, 1999. .
 Swanborough, Gordon and Peter M. Bowers. United States Navy Aircraft since 1911. London: Putnam, 1976. .
 Taylor, John W. R. (ed.) Jane's All the World's Aircraft 1961–62. London: Sampson Low, Marston and Company, 1961.
 Taylor, John W. R. (ed.) Jane's All the World's Aircraft 1966–1967. London: Sampson Low, Marston and Company, 1966.
 Taylor, John W. R. (ed.) Jane's All the World's Aircraft 1973–1974. London: Jane's Yearbooks, 1973.

External links

 de Havilland DHC-2 Beaver website by Neil Aird
 de Havilland Canada DHC-2 Beaver at the Canada Aviation and Space Museum
 "Plush Job For The Bush", November 1949, Popular Science

 
DHC-2
1940s Canadian civil utility aircraft
1940s Canadian military utility aircraft
Single-engined tractor aircraft
High-wing aircraft
Floatplanes
STOL aircraft
Aircraft first flown in 1947